Michael W. Cotter (born July 7, 1949) is an American attorney who served as the United States Attorney for the District of Montana from 2009 to 2017.

Education

Cotter graduated from the University of Notre Dame with a Bachelor of Business Administration, received his Master of Business Administration degree from the University of Utah and received his Juris Doctor. from the Notre Dame Law School.

Legal career

He began his legal career as an associate at the Law Offices of John C. Hoyt, later forming the Cotter & Cotter Law Firm with his wife, Patricia O'Brien Cotter. From 2000–2009, he was the sole practitioner at Michael W. Cotter, P.C. in Helena, Montana.

Military service 

Cotter served on active duty with the United States Army from 1972 to 1974 and was honorably discharged as a First Lieutenant.

See also
2017 dismissal of U.S. attorneys

References

1949 births
Living people
United States Attorneys for the District of Montana
Montana Democrats
Montana lawyers
Military personnel from Montana
United States Army officers
Mendoza College of Business alumni
David Eccles School of Business alumni
Notre Dame Law School alumni
20th-century American lawyers
21st-century American lawyers